Baronville (1941–44 Barenweiler) is a commune in the Moselle department in Grand Est in northeastern France.

History 
 Previous names: Barunvilla (896), Barandorf (1361), Barendorff (1383, 1461).
 In 2007 a group of three University of York students attempted to get the fictitious town of 'BaronVille' onto the new UK version of the board game Monopoly. The news media thought that this was a French plot and reported, without sources, that the people of Baronville itself were behind it.

Population

See also 
 Communes of the Moselle department

References

External links
 

Communes of Moselle (department)